Alan Carter may refer to:

 Alan Carter (philosopher) (born 1952), professor of philosophy at the University of Glasgow
 General Alan Carter, fictional character in the 1966 film Fantastic Voyage
 Alan Carter (Space: 1999), fictional character in the TV series Space: 1999
 Alan Carter (motorcyclist) (born 1964), English Grand Prix motorcycle racer
 Alan Carter (director) (born 1959), an American television director, writer, producer, and editor 
 Alan Carter (dancer) (1920−2009), English ballet dancer, choreographer and ballet master
 Alan Carter (civil servant) (1929−2016), British and Hong Kong immigration official

See also
Al Carter (disambiguation)